Nikolay Davydenko was the defending champion, but lost in the first round to Daniele Bracciali

Igor Andreev won in the final 5–7, 7–6(7–3), 6–2 against Nicolas Kiefer.

Seeds

Draw

Finals

Top half

Bottom half

External links
 2005 Kremlin Cup Draw
 2005 Kremlin Cup Qualifying Draw

Kremlin Cup
Kremlin Cup